Malik Shakeel Awan (born 25 January 1966) is a Pakistani politician and businessman who served as a member of the National Assembly of Pakistan from 2010 to 2013.

Early life and education

Awan was born on 25 January 1966 in Rawalpindi, Punjab.

He received his early education at The Capital School and graduated from Gordon College. Shakeel was and remained Student Leader of Gordon College from 1986 to 1990.

Political career

Early political career (1985–2002)
He started his political career in 1985 under the guidance of a senior PML(N) Leader, Khawaja Mehmood Ahmed Minto.
 
He had previously served as a nazim of UC 46 Rawalpindi, from 1985 to 2002, Awan was also the parliamentary leader of PML(N) in the District Assembly of Rawalpindi.

Politically inactive years (2002–2010) 
He ran for a seat on the Provincial Assembly of Punjab from constituency PP-12 (Rawalpindi-VII) as a candidate for PML-N in the 2002 Pakistani general election but was unsuccessful. He received 8,324 votes and lost the seat to Amar Fida Paracha of PPP.
 
Awan had not participated in the 2008 Pakistani general election, rather, he decided to later run as a candidate of the National Assembly of Pakistan, in the upcoming by-elections.

Candidate as a Member of the National Assembly of Pakistan (2010–2018) 

He was elected to the National Assembly of Pakistan from Constituency NA-55 (Rawalpindi-VI) as a candidate of Pakistan Muslim League (N) (PML-N) in by-polls held in February 2010. He received 63,888 votes and defeated Sheikh Rasheed Ahmad.
 
He ran for the seat of the National Assembly from Constituency NA-55 (Rawalpindi-VI) as a candidate of PML-N in the 2013 Pakistani general election but was unsuccessful. He received 75,306 votes and lost the seat to Sheikh Rasheed Ahmad. Awan is also know as to doing work in his constituency, without being a Member of The National Assembly of Pakistan.

Candidate as a Member of the Provincial Assembly of Punjab (2018–present) 
He ran for the seat of the Provincial Assembly of the Punjab from constituency PP-18 (Rawalpindi- XIII) as a candidate of PML-N in the 2018 general election. He received 33,114 votes but was unsuccessful and lost the seat to Ejaz Khan by 10,907 votes. Reportedly, the election results were delayed for two hours and as of 18 September 2022 the results still remain disputed.

Afterwards, not only the Pakistan Muslim League Nawaz candidates and leaders but also the Pakistan People's Party's  candidates and leaders claimed that their monitors in many voting centres had not received the official notifications of the precinct's results, but instead got hand-written tallies that they could not verify. "It is a sheer rigging. The way the people's mandate has blatantly been insulted, it is intolerable," Shehbaz Sharif told a news conference as the counting continued.

2022 Election Campaign

He was appointed to campaign for Pakistan Muslim League Nawaz in the constituency of PP-7 by-election Supplementary vote, after the Supreme Court of Pakistan had unseated 25 Members of the Provincial Assembly of Punjab from Pakistan Tehreek-e-Insaaf after they had switched Parties and had changed votes to Pakistan Muslim League (N) during the no-confidence motion against Imran Khan. Malik Shakeel Awan also led many rallies and as of 19 July, he was successful in his campaign and PMLN had won the seat in PP-7, being the only 2 seats who won.

The Opposition arose after the election results had been announced and had asked for a re-count. The Election Committee of Pakistan refused to their proposition and had given the statement that the results were indeed validated.

Candidate as a Member of National Assembly of Pakistan (2023–present) 
He is expected to run for the National Assembly of Pakistan after registering his electoral papers from his previous constituency where he was originally crowned the Lion of Rawalpindi, in the NA-62 (Rawalpindi-VI) by-election going to be held on 16th March 2023, after posting about his registration on social media

Portfolios held

Current portfolio(s)
 Provincial Co-Ordinator Punjab, Prime Minister Business Loan Scheme at PML(N)
 Senior Vice President Punjab PML-N Youth Wing
 Additional General Secretary Muslim League (N) Rawalpindi
 Member of the Central General Council of Pakistan.

Party portfolios held
 City President MSF, Rawalpindi (1986–1988)
 Student Leader Gordon College, Rawalpindi (1986–1990)
 Divisional president MSF, Rawalpindi (1988–1990)
 Divisional President Muslim League Youth Wing Rawalpindi (12 October 1999)
 District President Muslim League Youth Wing Rawalpindi (1990–1993)
 Worked as President of PP-3 Rawalpindi city PML(N) (1993–2002)
 Contested in the Provincial Assembly PP-12 election in the 2002 General elections and got remarkable votes

Public responsibilities held
 Elected Councilor (Municipal Corporation) in 1991
 Elected Councilor (Municipal Corporation) in 1998

References

External links 
 Malik Shakeel Awan on National Assembly of Pakistan

Pakistani MNAs 2008–2013
People from Rawalpindi District
Living people
1966 births
Government Gordon College alumni
Politicians from Rawalpindi